The Football League First Division Player of the Month award was a monthly prize of recognition given to association football players in the Football League First Division, the second tier of English football from 1992 to 2004. The award was announced in the first week of the following month. From the 2004–05 season onwards, following a rebranding exercise by The Football League, the second tier was known as the Football League Championship, thus the award became the Football League Championship Player of the Month award.

List of winners

For results from 2004–05 onwards, see EFL Championship Player of the Month.

Notes

References

Association football player of the month awards
Player of the Month
English Football League trophies and awards